Shodash Granth (literally sixteen books) is a collection of 16 books (or doctrines) written by Shri Vallabha Acharyaji. They are the main doctrine of Pushtimarg, a Vaishnav sect of Hinduism. The s serve as a lighthouse for devotees. They speak about increasing love for Shri Krishna through seva ('service') and smarana ('remembering'). These doctrines are Shri Mahaprabhuji’s way of encouraging and inspiring devotees on the path to grace. The central message of the Shodasha Granthas is total surrender to Lord Shri Krishna. A Goswami can introduce an eager soul to the path of Shri Krishna’s loving devotion and service. The verses explain types of devotees, the way to surrender, and the reward for seva, as well as other practical instructions. The devotee is nurtured by the Lord’s grace.

Books
The sixteen books are:
 Shri Yamunashtakam: An ode to Shree Yamuna Maharani
 Bal-bodh: A guide for beginners on the path of devotion
 Siddhant Muktavali: A string of pearls consisting of the principles/fundamentals of Pushtimarg
 Pusti-Pravaha-Maryada-bhedh: The different characteristics of the different types of souls (receptivity of the Lord’s grace)
 Siddhant Rahasya: The secret behind the principles
 Navratna: Nine jewels of instructions (priceless instructions for a devotee)
 Antah-Karan-Prabodhah: Consoling one's heart (request to one’s own heart)
 Vivek-Dhairya-Aashray: On discretion, patience and surrender
 Shri Krushna Aashray: Taking Shree Krishna’s shelter
 Chatuhshloki: Four verses (Verser) illustrating the four principles of life; Dharma, Arth, Kaam, Moksh
 Bhakti-Vardhini: Increase of devotion
 Jal-bhedh: Nineteen types of orators (Vakta)
 Pancha-Padyaani: Three types of listeners (Shrota)
 Sannyasa-Nirnayah: Decision on taking Renunciation
 Nirodh-Lakshanam: Identifying characteristics of detachment
 Sevafalam: The reward of performing seva (worship) of the Lord

Shuddha Advaita 
In which the entire universe is the manifestation of Brahman. This philosophy relies only on the "Brahman" to explain the creation of the universe, without depending on the concept of «Maya». Therefore, it is «pure». Brahman is the truth, the universe (the creation of the Brahman itself) is also true and the soul (Jiva) is a part of Brahman. Therefore, it is «Advaita».

Shri Yamunastakam 
Starting with the grace of Yamuna in Yamunashtaka Vallbhacharya says,
 It purifies body, mind and senses.
 The devotee has no other desire except union with God and enjoyment of God's love after purification of heart, and change of nature.

Bal-bodh
 In Balbodha, Vallbhacharya provides teaching on what to do when one is in the junior stage of spiritual life and has the desire to unite with God, without having sufficiently developed spiritual sense.
 Food develops the body, education develops knowledge, and dharma to the world develops one as a good person. Dharma to Pushti marga develops as a good vaishnav, and dharma to the soul brings one closer to God.
 Balbodha teaches how the soul should act in these four principles: dharma ('duty'), artha ('wealth'), kama ('happiness'), and moksha ('salvation') under two main categories: Vedic, i.e. considered by the Vedas, and Lau-kika, considered by the sages.

Siddhant Muktavali 
 At the end of Balbodha, Vallabhacharya concludes that salvation is the goal, and the goal is to offer seva.
 A devotee of God who wishes to understand and reach Krishna must offer service (seva), with selfless devotion and love, not by knowledge or worship. This seva is of three kinds – tanuja (to be done with the body), vittaja (to be done with money) and mansi (mentally). Mansi is the best because one spends more time outside than inside seva.
 Vallabhacharya states that God has three forms like the river Ganges: the physical – what is seen (Aadhibhau-tika), the spiritual – what is felt (Adhaytmika) and the divine – the presence one sees (Adhidaivika). Like these three forms of the Ganges, God also has three forms – the physical (the world), the spiritual (Akshara), and divine (Krshna). God is described in the Upa-nishadas as Sat-chit-A nand (Being, consciousness and joy).

Antahkaranprabodhah 
This was composed by ShriVallabh in Adel.

Krunasharay Stotram 
In this stotra Shri Vallabh sorrowfully described the worst situation of society due to Kali Yuga to Shri Govardhan Nath ji. It tells about the lack of dharmas, the vedas, witness, patience in the people of Kali Yuga. Vallabh worries how he can establish a relationship between Lord Krishna who is so pure and the people are so lowered by ethics and sinful. Again he prays to uplift people as you (Shrinathji) saved sinful Ajamil.

References 

Hindu texts
Vaishnavism